Irving Edward Kane (c. 1930 - October 8, 2019) was a Massachusetts politician who served as the 47th Mayor of Lynn, Massachusetts. The young James Carrigan was a member of his campaign staff and, shaped by the experience, six years later he was elected to a seat in the State House, and a State Senate seat in a special election a year after that.

Notes

Mayors of Lynn, Massachusetts
1930s births
2019 deaths